Amegilla fallax is a species of bee belonging to the family Apidae subfamily Apinae.

References

External links
 ADW: Amegilla fallax: CLASSIFICATION
 AN UPDATED CHECKLIST OF BEES OF SRI LANKA WITH NEW RECORDS

Apinae
Insects described in 1879